Col Skirving Stokes (23 October 1905 – 14 September 1980) was a former Australian rules footballer who played in Tasmania between 1926 and 1937, reached representative level and was a leading goalkicker at both club and competition level.

Col Stokes played for Longford in the Northern Tasmanian Football Association and for much of his career was one of the leading goalkickers in the competition.

Stokes was chosen in a number of NTFA sides for representative intrastate matches.

He was inducted into the Tasmanian Football Hall of Fame in 2008.

References

1905 births
1980 deaths
Tasmanian Football Hall of Fame inductees
Longford Football Club players
Australian rules footballers from Tasmania